Edwin Haslam (1932 – 3 October 2013) was an organic chemist and an author of books on polyphenols. He was an alumnus of Sir John Deane's College in Northwich, Cheshire, United Kingdom and was for many years Professor of Organic Chemistry at the University of Sheffield.

Haslam proposed a first comprehensive definition of plant polyphenols based on the earlier proposals of Edgar Charles Bate-Smith, Tony Swain and Theodore White, which includes specific structural characteristics common to all phenolics having a tanning property. It is referred to as the White–Bate-Smith–Swain–Haslam (WBSSH) definition.

Works 
 Chemistry of vegetable tannins, 1 edition – first published in 1966
 The shikimate pathway, 2 editions – first published in 1974
 Metabolites and metabolism, 1 edition – first published in 1985
 Plant polyphenols: vegetable tannins revisited, 1 edition – first published in 1989 
 Shikimic acid, 1 edition – first published in 1993
 Practical Polyphenolics, 2 editions – first published in 1998,

References

External links
 Edwin Haslam on openlibrary.org

1932 births
2013 deaths
Organic chemists
Academics of the University of Sheffield
British science writers
British chemists
Inorganic chemists
People educated at Sir John Deane's College